Timothy Morrison (born April 3, 1963) is a former American football cornerback who played in the National Football League (NFL) for the Washington Redskins. He played college football at the University of North Carolina at Chapel Hill.

References

1963 births
Living people
American football cornerbacks
Washington Redskins players
North Carolina Tar Heels football players
People from Raeford, North Carolina